Wesh or WESH may refer to:

Wesh in Spin Boldak, Kandahar province, Afghanistan
Wesh–Chaman border crossing one of the major international border crossings between Afghanistan and Pakistan
Darrell Wesh (1992), Haitian-American sprinter
Marlena Wesh (1991), Haitian-American sprinter
Wesh, French-language song by Mokobé and Gradur, in 2015
WESH, television station serving Orlando, Florida